Karel Herbst (born 6 November 1943, in Prague) is an emeritus auxiliary bishop of Prague, a titular bishop of Siccesi and Salesian. In the 1980s, he was the main organizer of the Salesian huts, holiday events for children in the Catholic underground. Among their participants he was known as Kája. On 19 February 2002 he was appointed and appointed on 6 April 2002 by the Assistant Bishop of the Prague Roman Catholic Archdiocese. From 1 December 2016, at his own request, he became an emeritus Bishop.

He suffered from coronavirus disease in March 2020.

References

21st-century Roman Catholic bishops in the Czech Republic
1943 births
Living people
Salesian bishops
Clergy from Prague